Rudnia may refer to the following places:

Poland
 Rudnia, Gmina Czarna Białostocka in Podlaskie Voivodeship, north-east Poland
 Rudnia, Gmina Michałowo in Podlaskie Voivodeship, north-east Poland
 Rudnia, Warmian-Masurian Voivodeship, north Poland
 Rudnia River, a tributary in Poland of the Narew

Lithuania
 Rudnia (Kaniava), a village in Kaniava eldership, Varėna district municipality, Alytus County, Lithuania